"Nevertheless I'm in Love with You" (sometimes referred to simply as "Nevertheless") is a popular song written by Harry Ruby with lyrics by Bert Kalmar, first published in 1931. The song was a hit for Jack Denny in 1931, and was revisited in 1950 by The Mills Brothers, Paul Weston, Ray Anthony, Ralph Flanagan, Frankie Laine and Frank Sinatra, with perhaps the most compelling version being that of the McGuire Sisters.

The Mills Brothers' rendition was released by Decca Records as catalog number 27253. It first reached the Billboard magazine charts on November 3, 1950 and lasted 15 weeks on the chart, peaking at #9.

The recording by Paul Weston was released by Columbia Records as catalog number 38982. It first reached the Billboard magazine charts on October 20, 1950 and lasted 15 weeks on the chart, peaking at #9.

The recording by Ray Anthony was released by Capitol Records as catalog number 1190. It first reached the Billboard magazine charts on October 27, 1950 and lasted 14 weeks on the chart, peaking at #15. The flip side was "Harbor Lights".

The recording by Ralph Flanagan was released by RCA Victor Records as catalog number 20-3904. It first reached the Billboard magazine charts on October 6, 1950 and lasted 10 weeks on the chart, peaking at #16. The flip side was "The Red We Want Is the Red We've Got".

'Nevertheless' was featured in the movie Three Little Words (1950), a film about the songwriters.

The song appeared as a soundtrack in a drama film Lianna (1983) and was performed by Jeanne Stahl.

Recorded versions

The Andrews Sisters
Seger Ellis
Ray Anthony (1950)
Fred Astaire
Count Basie
Les Baxter (1954)
Michael Bublé (featuring The Puppini Sisters) (2013)
Bing Crosby for his album Feels Good, Feels Right (1976).
Jimmy Dorsey and his Orchestra
Ruth Etting
Ralph Flanagan and his Orchestra (1950)
Dick Haymes
Ronnie Dove
Frankie Laine (1950)
Guy Lombardo
Barry Manilow (2010)
Dean Martin
The McGuire Sisters
The Mills Brothers (1950)
Liza Minnelli
Anne Murray
Olivia Newton-John
New Seekers (1973)
Andy Gibb
Jeanne Stahl
Harry Nilsson
Patti Page
Sid Phillips and his Orchestra Refrain: Geraldine Farrar. Recorded in London on September 25, 1950. It was released by EMI on the His Master's Voice label as catalog number BD 6077.
Johnnie Ray
Revolver (2010)
Alan Safier (2011)
Frank Sinatra (1950)
Hank Snow
Kay Starr - I Cry By Night (1962)
Rod Stewart (2005) from the album Thanks for the Memory: The Great American Songbook, Volume IV
Mel Tormé
Rudy Vallée (1931)
Frankie Vaughan
Paul Weston and his Orchestra (1950)
Betty White
Telly Savalas (1975)
Sonny Stitt (1950)
Bob Dylan - Fallen Angels (2016)
Mark Lowry - Unforgettable Classics (2013)
Dick Powell - Richard Diamond, Old Time Radio Episode, Marilyn Connors Case," January 12, 1951

References

Songs with music by Harry Ruby
Songs with lyrics by Bert Kalmar
1931 songs
Frankie Laine songs